Lou Davis (May 14, 1881 – October 18, 1961) was an American songwriter, and author associated with Tin Pan Alley. He was also a businessman in the wholesale meat business. His primary musical collaborators were Abel Baer, Henry Busse, Harold Arlen, Henry Lange, and J. Fred Coots. Several of his most notable songs include "Hot Lips", "A Precious Little Thing Called Love", "Deep in the Arms of Love", "Here Comes My Ball and Chain", and "I'm Croonin' a Tune About June".

References

Bibliography
Vogel, Frederick G. World War I Songs: A History and Dictionary of Popular American Patriotic Tunes, with Over 300 Complete Lyrics. Jefferson: McFarland & Company, Inc., 1995. .

External links
 Lou Davis recordings at the Discography of American Historical Recordings

1881 births
1961 deaths
American male songwriters
20th-century male musicians